Dennis Martin Walling (born April 17, 1954) is a former Major League Baseball player. Walling played all or parts of 18 seasons in the majors, from 1975 to 1992. His most frequent position was third base, but he also saw significant time as an outfielder and first baseman.

Walling may be best known as a pinch-hitting specialist for the Houston Astros. Nicknamed "Good Wood", Walling was a valuable bat off the bench for most of his career.  Entering the 2009 season, his 108 career pinch hits are tied for 13th all-time.  He hit .271 with 799 hits in 2,945 lifetime at bats with 49 home runs and 380 RBI in 1,271 games. Walling served as the hitting coach for the Norfolk Tides, the Triple-A affiliate of the Baltimore Orioles before Butch Davis

Amateur career
Walling grew up in Farmingdale, New Jersey, and played baseball at Howell High School in New Jersey.

Walling played college baseball at Clemson University. He was drafted by the St. Louis Cardinals in the 8th round of the 1974 Major League Baseball Draft, but chose to remain at Clemson. He was then drafted in the secondary phase of the 1975 draft by the Oakland Athletics.

Professional playing career

Oakland
Walling began his professional career as an outfielder. Just three months after being drafted by the A's, and before he appeared in a game in the minor leagues, Walling made his major league debut on September 7, 1975. He appeared in six games for Oakland down the stretch, getting one hit in eight at bats for a batting average of .125.

Walling opened the next season in the minors with the Chattanooga Lookouts, the A's Class-AA affiliate. After batting .257 in 115 games for Chattanooga, Walling was again in Oakland in September. This time, he played just three games, going 3-for-11 for a .273 average.

In , Walling was back in the minors to start the year, but played just three games for the Class-AAA San Jose Missions in the first two months due to injuries. On June 15, Walling was traded to the Houston Astros for outfielder Willie Crawford, who was playing his last season in the majors after a long career.

Houston
After being traded to the Astros, Walling was assigned to Class-AAA Charleston Charlies. He played 29 games for Charleston and batted .348. It would be the last time Walling played in the minor leagues for over a decade. He was once again promoted to the majors in September, this time playing in six games, going 6-for-21 (.286 average) with 6 RBI.

In , Walling was the closest thing the Astros had to a regular left fielder, playing 49 games there, more than anyone else on the team. However, even then, he made more appearances as a pinch hitter than in the field, as he played only 55 of his 120 games as an outfielder. The Astrodome was a notoriously difficult place to be a batter, but Walling managed to be about an average major league hitter, posting an OPS+ of exactly 100. Overall, Walling batted .251 for the Astros, with 36 RBI.

Over the next ten seasons, Walling played much the same role on the Astros, generally playing only against right-handed pitchers. For his career, Walling batted seven times as often against righties as against left-handed pitchers, prompted perhaps by his significantly lower batting average (.276 vs. righties, .236 vs. lefties) and slugging percentage (.399, .330).

In Game 2 of the 1981 National League Division Series, Walling hit a walk-off single against the Dodgers.

Cardinals
Walling played two and a half seasons in St. Louis, mostly as a pinch hitter.

End of career
Going into , Walling signed with the Texas Rangers. However, he went just 4-for-44 in 27 games, for a batting average of just .091. He had just one double and three singles among his hits, and had just 2 RBI. He was released by the Rangers in June, and did not play professionally for the rest of the season. In , Walling briefly attempted a comeback with his longtime team, the Houston Astros. However, he batted just three times with one hit before retiring.

Coaching career
After his playing career ended, Walling remained in baseball as a coach. In the major leagues, he has served as the hitting coach for the Athletics from  until , and for the New York Mets from  until . In both positions, he served under manager Art Howe, who was his teammate in Houston. In , he was hired by the Orioles as their roving minor league instructor and later became the hitting coach for the Norfolk Tides.

References

External links

1954 births
Living people
Baseball players from New Jersey
Brookdale Jersey Blues baseball players
Oakland Athletics players
Houston Astros players
Howell High School (New Jersey) alumni

St. Louis Cardinals players
Texas Rangers players
Oakland Athletics coaches
New York Mets coaches
Major League Baseball third basemen
Major League Baseball first basemen
People from Farmingdale, New Jersey
People from Neptune Township, New Jersey
Sportspeople from Monmouth County, New Jersey
Major League Baseball hitting coaches
Chattanooga Lookouts players
San Jose Missions players
Charleston Charlies players
Tucson Toros players
Oklahoma City 89ers players
Senadores de San Juan players